Eesha Karavade (born 21 November 1987) is a chess player from Pune, India. 
She holds the titles of International Master (IM) and Woman Grandmaster (WGM). She played for India in the Chess Olympiads of 2010, 2012 and 2014.

Achievements 
won the Shiv Chhatrapati Award conferred by Govt. of Maharashtra in 2004.
in 2011: first runner-up, with 8 points out of 11 rounds, in the 38th National Women's Premier Chess Championship at Chennai, which was won by Mary Ann Gomes.
Gold Medalist Commonwealth Chess Championship 2011 in South Africa.
Bronze medalist Asian Individual Women Chess Championship 2011 in Iran.
part of the women chess team that ranked 4th at the 40th Chess Olympiad 2012 at Istanbul.
part of the women chess team that won a gold medal in the Blitz format and silver medal in the Rapid and Standard format at Asian Nations Cup 2014 at Tabriz.

References

External links 
 
 

1987 births
Living people
Indian female chess players
Chess International Masters
Chess woman grandmasters
Chess Olympiad competitors
Chess players at the 2010 Asian Games
Sportswomen from Maharashtra
21st-century Indian women
21st-century Indian people
Asian Games competitors for India